The Lonely Killers is a 1972 Belgian crime film directed by Boris Szulzinger. The film was selected as the Belgian entry for the Best Foreign Language Film at the 45th Academy Awards, but was not accepted as a nominee.

Cast
 Georges Aminel as Le journaliste
 Georges Aubert
 Marc Audier
 Christian Barbier as L'ouvrier
 Patricia Cornelis
 Marc de Géorgi
 Marc Delsaert
 Jean Droze
 Daniel Dury
 Franz Gouvy
 Daniel Horowitz
 Hubert Jeuken

See also
 List of submissions to the 45th Academy Awards for Best Foreign Language Film
 List of Belgian submissions for the Academy Award for Best Foreign Language Film

References

External links
 

1972 films
1972 crime films
1970s French-language films
Films directed by Boris Szulzinger
Belgian crime films
French-language Belgian films